Cambridge Christian School may refer to:
 Cambridge Christian School (Florida), a K-12 private school
 Cambridge Christian School (Minnesota), a K-12 private school

See also 
 The Cambridge School (disambiguation)